Gates Ventures is the personal service company of Microsoft co-founder and philanthropist Bill Gates. Known until 2018 as bgC3, it comprises his personal staff, a think tank on problems of health and global development, and a technology investment portfolio. The firm is distinct from Cascade Investment and the Bill & Melinda Gates Foundation although Gates uses it to support the Foundation's projects. Areas of research and investment include climate change, clean energy and Alzheimer's disease.

Gates Ventures is located at Kirkland, Washington, in the same complex with Cascade and Melinda French Gates' Pivotal Ventures. Niranjan Bose is currently Gates Ventures' managing director.

References

2008 establishments in Washington (state)
Bill Gates
Companies based in Kirkland, Washington
Think tanks based in the United States
Think tanks established in 2008